Eremophila tenella is a flowering plant in the figwort family, Scrophulariaceae and is endemic to Western Australia. It is an erect, spindly shrub with pendulous branches and with its branches and leaves covered with a layer of fine, branched, yellow-grey hairs. Its buds are yellowish but open to white or pale lilac flowers.

Description
Its branches, leaves and other green parts are covered with a layer of yellowish-grey, star-like hairs which are difficult to distinguish as individual hairs.

The flower buds are yellowish but when the flowers open, the petals are white to pale lilac. The outside of the petal tube is mostly glabrous but the outer surface of the petal lobes is hairy, whilst their inner surface is glabrous. The inside of the tube is filled with long, soft hairs. The 4 stamens are fully enclosed in the petal tube.

Taxonomy and naming 
The species was first formally described by Robert Chinnock in 2007 and the description was published in Eremophila and Allied Genera: A Monograph of the Plant Family Myoporaceae. The specific epithet (tenella) is a Latin word meaning "soft" or "delicate", referring to the slender, flexible branches.

Distribution and habitat 

Conservation
Eremophila tenella is classified as "Priority One" by the Western Australian Government Department of Parks and Wildlife, meaning that it is known from only one or a few locations which are potentially at risk.

Use in horticulture
This eremophila is new to horticulture and its requirements in the garden are not well known. It can be propagated by grafting onto Myoporum rootstock and mature plants require a well-drained soil in a sunny position. It has proven difficult to grow in southern states and is known to be damaged by frost.

References

Eudicots of Western Australia
tenella
Endemic flora of Western Australia
Plants described in 2007
Taxa named by Robert Chinnock